Mauer is a village in south western Germany. It is located between Heidelberg and Sinsheim in the Rhein-Neckar district in the state of Baden-Württemberg.

On 1 June 2012, John Ehret (no party) took office as mayor.  He is the first black mayor in Baden-Württemberg and thought to be the first black mayor in Germany in modern times.

Geography
Mauer is located at an altitude of 130–240 m, and covers an area of 630 hectares. Of this area, 22.8% is covered by settlements, roads and paved areas, 55.3% is agricultural, and 18.6% is forested. Adjacent municipalities are, starting in the north and moving clockwise, Wiesenbach, Meckesheim, Wiesloch, Leimen and Bammental.

Religion
In 1522, the Reformation was introduced into Mauer; probably by Franz von Sickingen. Today it hosts both an evangelical and a Roman Catholic church community.

Geology/Archaeology
Mauer is the location where the first remains of Homo heidelbergensis were found. The remains, a jaw, were discovered in 1907 in the local sand quarry by Daniel Hartmann, a worker there. The sandpit remained active for some time, and the original resting place of the remains no longer exists. However, the sandpit is now a nature park, and the sedimentary layers corresponding to those of the original find can be viewed on a 25 meter high section.

Persons of Interest

Honored Citizens
 Daniel Hartmann (1854-1952) found the lower jaw of Homo heidelbergensis.
 Gerhard Weiser (1931-2003) was Mayor of Mauer from 1962 to 1976. In 1968 he moved to the Landtag for the first time and later became the Minister of Agriculture in Baden-Württemberg from 1976 to 1996. From 1996 to 2001 he was vice-president of the state parliament. In spite of his political commitment, he remained connected to his hometown and also managed a farm there.
 Erich Mick, mayor from 1976 to 2001, founder of the association Homo heidelbergensis of Mauer e.V.

Other Notables Associated with Mauer
 Karl von Zyllnhardt (forestry officer) (1744-1816), German landlord and forestry officer.
 Karl von Zyllnhardt (jurist) (1779-1828), German jurist and politician.

References

Rhein-Neckar-Kreis
Paleoanthropological sites